Huỳnh Quốc Anh (born 10 May 1985) is a retired Vietnamese footballer who played as a left winger for V-League (Vietnam) club SHB Đà Nẵng F.C. and the Vietnam national team.

International career

International goals
Scores and results list Vietnam's goal tally first.

References

External links

1985 births
Living people
Vietnamese footballers
Association football wingers
V.League 1 players
SHB Da Nang FC players
People from Quảng Nam province
Vietnam international footballers